Santhi Soundarajan (also spelled Shanthi Soundararajan, born 17 April 1981) is a                        track and field athlete from Tamil Nadu, India. She is the winner of 12 international medals for India and around 50 medals for her home state of Tamil Nadu. Shanthi Soundarajan is the first Tamil woman to win a medal at the Asian Games. She competes in middle distance track events. She was stripped of a silver medal won at the 2006 Asian Games after failing a sex verification test which disputed her eligibility to participate in the women's competition.

Early life and career
Santhi was born in 1981 in the village of Kathakkurichi in the Pudukkottai District of Tamil Nadu, India. Santhi grew up in a 20-by-5-foot hut across the road from the new home she lives in now. There was no bathroom or outhouse, nor was there running water or electricity. She is one of five children of brick-kiln labourers in a rural village in southern Tamil Nadu state; she overcame malnutrition as a child to become a middle-distance runner. Her family could not even afford a television and watched Santhi's Doha race at a neighbour's house. Her mother and father had to go to another town to work in a brickyard, where they earned the American equivalent of $4 a week. While they were gone, Santhi, the oldest, was in charge of taking care of her four siblings. Sometimes, Santhi's grandfather, an accomplished runner, helped while her parents were away. When she was 13, he taught her to run on an open stretch of dirt outside the hut and bought her a pair of shoes.

At her first competition, in eighth grade, Santhi won a tin cup trophy; she collected 13 more in interschool competitions. The sports coach at a nearby high school took note of her performances and recruited her. The school paid her tuition and provided her with a uniform and hot lunches. It was the first time Santhi had ever eaten three meals a day.

After high school, Santhi got a scholarship from an Arts college in Pudukkottai, the nearest town. and the following year, Santhi transferred to a college in Chennai, the state's capital, which was seven hours away. In 2005, she attended the Asian Athletics Championships in South Korea, where she won a silver medal. In 2006, she was chosen to represent India at the Asian Games (run by the Olympic Council of Asia). In the 800 meters, Santhi took the silver in 2 minutes, 3.16 seconds, beating Viktoriya Yalovtseva of Kazakhstan by 0.03 seconds.  This win led to Santhi becoming embroiled in an ongoing, unresolved debate over what makes an athlete eligible to compete in the women's division.

In 2004 Santhi was awarded 1 lakh cash from then Tamil Nadu Chief Minister Jayalalithaa.

Santhi holds the national record for the women's 3000 metres steeplechase clocking 10:44.65 seconds. At a national meet in Bangalore in July 2005, she won the 800m, 1,500m and 3000m. She won the silver medal in 800 m at the 2005 Asian Championships in Incheon, South Korea.

Asian Games controversy
Santhi won a silver medal in the women's 800m race at the 2006 Asian Games held in Doha, Qatar clocking 2 minutes, 3.16 seconds.
 
However, she underwent a sex test shortly afterwards, and the results indicated that she "does not possess the sexual characteristics of a woman". While such sex tests are not compulsory for competitors, the International Association of Athletics Federations can request that contenders take such tests at any time, and include intensive evaluation by a gynecologist, a geneticist, an endocrinologist, a psychologist, and an internal medicine specialist. Reports initially suggested that her upbringing in impoverished rural India, where she reportedly only started eating proper meals in 2004, could be a factor behind the test result. In a 2016 video petition, Santhi Soundarajan disclosed that she has been told she has androgen insensitivity syndrome.

Five days after the news report, Santhi says, she received a call from Lalit Bhanot, a former joint secretary of the Indian Olympic Association. Bhanot spoke to Santhi in English. "He told Santhi she can't do sports anymore,'. When she asked why, she was told: It's been confirmed, Santhi cannot compete in sports." Soon after the results of the sex test came out, she was stripped of her silver medal.

Santhi returned to her village in humiliation and promptly fell into serious depression. Months later, she tried to kill herself by ingesting a type of poison used by veterinarians. A friend found her vomiting uncontrollably and took her to a hospital.

Later life
In January 2007, the Tamil Nadu Chief Minister Karunanidhi awarded Santhi a television set and a cash prize of Rs. 1.5 million for her Doha Games effort, despite the fallout of Santhi failing a gender test. Santhi spent her reward money on her students; there are an average of 68 (trainees) and none of them is charged any fee.

Santhi's application to the state-run railways for a job before the games was turned down because the athlete failed a gender test.

In September 2007, Santhi was reported to have attempted suicide, reportedly by consuming a veterinary drug at her residence. The attempt was blamed on gender, economic, and sports pressure in India.

Two months later, Santhi took up coaching, starting a training academy at her home district of Pudukkottai, and became a temporary athletics coach with the regional government. By 2009, her academy had 68 students and her students had won the first and third positions in the Chennai marathon.

Santhi was admitted to the NIS athletic coach diploma course in Bangalore in 2013. Santhi was one of the 24 coaches in athletics, out of the 108 students who attended the course in eight disciplines. on 30 April 2014 she became a qualified athletics coach, being awarded the NIS diploma certificate at the Sports Authority of India graduation ceremony in Bangalore. Santhi doesn't have a permanent job at that time. Commenting on Santhi's situation, Olympic shooter Anjali Bhagwat, who termed the incident as "shameful," said "The athlete should be given at least a central or state government job for her financial stability, in lieu of what Santhi has done for the country".

In December 2014, with the help of gender activist Gopi Shankar Madurai, Santhi met Pon. Radhakrishnan, Minister of State for Road Transport and Highways, Olympic silver medallist Rajyavardhan Singh Rathore, Minister of State for Information Technology and Broadcasting, and Union Sports and Youth Affairs Minister Sarbananda Sonowal in New Delhi to present a request for assistance securing a permanent job as an athletics coach, and in restoring her 800m silver medal from the 2006 Doha Asian Games.

Radhakrishnan, a political heavyweight from Tamil Nadu, in turn, wrote to Sports Minister Sarbananda Sonowal to release a cash award to Santhi, but the Ministry's response was unfavorable: she was informed through a letter that since the medal has not been restored to her, the Ministry cannot give a Rs 10 lakh cash award for the medal. Also, the Ministry does not provide or recommend jobs in central/state government offices.

Santhi told the BBC Tamil Service that the Indian authorities had not fought her case after she was stripped of her silver medal at the 2006 Asian Games in Doha.

On 29 July 2015, the Madras High Court directed the State government to consider Santhi's plea for relaxation in educational qualifications and help her become a coach at the Sports Development Authority of Tamil Nadu (SDATN). As per the notification issued by the Youth Welfare and Sports Development in April 2015, an applicant contesting for the post of the coach should have an education qualification of a bachelor's degree and Santhi did not have one. Justice D. Hariparanthaman directed the Secretary of the Youth Welfare and Sports Development to "consider her claim for the post of coach by granting requisite relaxation as a special case", in the light of the documents produced by her in the sports area and pass appropriate orders within six weeks.

On 27 September 2016 the National Commission for Scheduled Castes (NCSC) served a notice on the Ministry of Youth Affairs and Sports in response to a petition filed by Santhi. The NCSC investigated allegations of injustice and sought a response in the matter from the secretary of the Department of Sports within 30 days.

On 16 October 2016 Santhi was informed that the State government decided to appoint her as a permanent athletic coach under Sports Development Authority of Tamil Nadu. Tamil Nadu Sports Minister K. Pandiarajan said the State will plead her case with the International Court of Arbitration for Sport. he also stated that the Tamil Nadu Government will write to SAI, Indian Olympic Association and Athletics Federation of India to take up Santhi's case in that forum.

Santhi received her appointment order for a permanent athletic coach under SDAT on 20 December 2016 from Tamil Nadu Sports Minister K. Pandiarajan at the Fort St. George, India.

On 3 January 2017 Gopi Shankar Madurai who is closely working with Santhi said she will file a human rights violation case against Athletic Federation of India and Indian Olympic Association at Madras High Court or the Apex of India.

On 16 February 2017 The National Human Rights Commission of India rejected Santhi's complaint claims it's too late to accept it.

Achievements and honours
Santhi has won 12 international medals and 50 national medals, including:
 Gold Medal – 2005 Asian Indoor Games – 4x400 relay
 Gold Medal – 2005 Asian Indoor Games – 800 meters
 Silver Medal – 2006 Asian Games- 800 meters
 Gold Medal – 2006 South Asian Games – 1500 meters
 Gold Medal – 2006 South Asian Games – 4x400 relay
 Gold Medal – 2003 International Peace Sports Festival – 5000 meters
 Silver Medal – 2006 South Asian Games – 800 meters
 Silver Medal – 2005 Asian Athletics Championships – 800 meters
 Silver Medal – 2004 Asian Grand Prix, Bangalore – 800 meters
 Silver Medal – 2004 Asian Grand Prix, Pune – 800 meters
 Silver Medal – 2003 International Peace Sports Festival – 800 meters
 Bronze Medal – 2003 International Peace Sports Festival – 400 meters

IAAF policy and support for other athletes
Santhi's case has been contrasted with that of Caster Semenya of South Africa, also a middle-distance runner, who nearly lost the gold she won at the 2009 Berlin World Championship after she failed a similar gender test. Semenya's nation rallied around her to safeguard her dignity, her rights and position in world sports. She was also her country's flag-bearer at the London Olympics 2012. Santhi supported Semenya, fearing that Semenya would face the same humiliation that she did.

Santhi also extended her support to Dutee Chand and said the youngster should not be victimized. She also expressed her dismay at the lack of sensitivity in the handling of the Dutee Chand issue, fearing that the young athlete's future may have now been jeopardized. Santhi demanded that all steps be taken to ensure the 18-year-old's return to the track.

Welcoming the Court of Arbitration for Sport's ruling in favour of Chand on 27 July 2015 for suspending gender test, the landmark ruling has also fuelled Santhi's hopes of regaining the silver medal and the Rs 10-lakh prize money from the central government which was withheld after the gender test row.

In this regard, it is notable that the IAAF policy, suspended as a result of Chand's case, did not prevent Santhi from competing. Kalra, Kulshreshtha and Unnikrishnan, writing in the Indian Journal of Endocrinology and Metabolism in 2012, stated that "Chromosomal sex, used to disqualify Santhi in 2010, is not mentioned at all in the current guidelines." Immediately prior to the 2016 Olympic Games and in response to sex verification controversies, Genel, Simpson and de la Chapelle in the Journal of the American Medical Association stated "One of the fundamental recommendations published almost 25 years ago ... that athletes born with a disorder of sex development and raised as females be allowed to compete as women remains appropriate".

In popular culture
In 2006, Amitabh Bachchan raised a question on Santhi in the show Kaun Banega Crorepati 2 he hosted.

The character of Valli in the Tamil film Ethir Neechal is a tribute to Santhi.

In August 2016 Thappad, an online platform and mobile application, made a video as part of an online campaign that is asking for Santhi's name to be included in the official records again and that the government should give her a permanent job to rebuild her life.

Put Chutney online comedy group under Culture Machine Media Pvt Ltd made a video in Tamil, to explain the significance of her struggle to residents of Tamil Nadu.

See also
Sex verification in sports
Androgen insensitivity syndrome
Ethir Neechal

References

1981 births
Living people
Intersex sportspeople
Intersex women
People from Pudukkottai district
Indian female middle-distance runners
21st-century Indian women
21st-century Indian people
Indian female steeplechase runners
Sex verification in sports
Athletes (track and field) at the 2006 Asian Games
Sportswomen from Tamil Nadu
South Asian Games gold medalists for India
South Asian Games silver medalists for India
Asian Games competitors for India
South Asian Games medalists in athletics